Gudmund Olav Restad (19 December 1937 – 18 September 2021) was a politician for the Norwegian Centre Party. He was Minister of Finance from 1997 to 2000. Prior to that, he served as Mayor of Smøla from 1980 to 1985 when he was elected to Parliament.

References

1937 births
2021 deaths
People from Skaun
Ministers of Finance of Norway
Members of the Storting
Centre Party (Norway) politicians
21st-century Norwegian politicians
20th-century Norwegian politicians